Zarrin Shahr (also Romanized as Zarīn Shahr; also known as Qal‘eh Rīz, Rīz-e Lanjān, and Rīz) is a city and capital of Lenjan County, Isfahan Province, Iran. At the 2006 census, its population was 55,984, in 15,154 families.  It is located in southwest of Isfahan.

Name
Until the 1970s Zarrinshahr was known as Riz-e Lenjan (or simply Riz for the locals). The name changed to Zarrinshahr as a result of what seems to be merely bureaucratic decision making.

Geography and climate
Zarrinshahr is located in the lush plain of the Zayandeh Rood (or Zayandeh River), not too far from the Zagros mountain range. The climate is temperate, the four seasons occur regularly and are clearly differentiated. It experiences a few snowfalls a year but not much rain. Summer is hot and temperatures can hit 36 on some days. Summer however is quite pleasant due to lack of humidity and low temperatures at night. The locals often hit the riverside at night for dinner or after dinner tea.

Population
Zarrin Shahr has a population of about 55,000. Expatriate Zohreh Bayatrizi describes the city as multi-cultural. The two main groups are Persians, who have lived in the area at least since 12th century AD, and Azeri Turks, who were forcibly settled in Riz in the 17th century by the Safavid rulers.

In the past 30 years people, from various parts of Iran have moved to Zarrin Shahr to work in the nearby steel mill factory (zobe ahan). The single largest immigrant group are the Bakhtiaris from the nearby province of Chahar Mahal Va Bakhtiari. The second largest group are from Khuzestan after the onset of the Iran–Iraq War in 1980. Most of the latter were placed in camps just outside the city and most have returned home after the ceasefire.

Sports
Zarrin Shahr has Greco-Roman wrestling and martial arts teams that are competitive nationally.

Gallery 
Nature of Zarrin Shahr

References

Populated places in Lenjan County
Cities in Isfahan Province